The list of college football yearly passing and total offense leaders identifies the major college passing leaders for each season from 1937 to the present. It includes yearly leaders in three statistical categories: (1) passing yardage; (2) passing touchdowns; and (3) passer rating.

Overview

Yardage 
The NCAA record for passing yards in a single season has been broken 10 times since 1937: by Davey O'Brien in 1938 with 1,457 yards; by Stan Heath in 1948 with 2,005 yards; by Don Trull in 1963 with 2,157 yards; by Jerry Rhome in 1964 with 2,870 yards; by Billy Anderson in 1965 with 3,464 yards; by Jim McMahon in 1980 with 4,571 yards; by Andre Ware in 1989 with 4,699 yards; by Ty Detmer in 1990 with 5,188 yards; by B. J. Symons in 2003 with 5,833 yards; and Bailey Zappe in 2021 with 5,967 yards.

Only seven players have led the NCAA in passing yardage in multiple seasons.  They are Brandon Doughty in 2014 and 2015; Case Keenum in 2009 and 2011; Graham Harrell in 2007 and 2008; Colt Brennan in 2005 and 2006; Tim Rattay in 1998 and 1999; Ty Detmer in 1990 and 1991; and Robbie Bosco in 1984 and 1985.

Four programs in the post-1936 "modern era" have had different players lead major-college football in passing yardage in consecutive seasons. The first was Tulsa in 1964 and 1965, respectively with Jerry Rhome and Billy Anderson. BYU has accomplished the feat twice—first with Marc Wilson in 1979 and Jim McMahon in 1980, and then with Steve Young in 1983 and Bosco the following two seasons. Texas Tech is the only program to have had three different players lead in consecutive seasons, doing so from 2002 to 2004 with Kliff Kingsbury, B. J. Symons, and Sonny Cumbie. The most recent program to accomplish this feat is Western Kentucky, with Zappe in 2021 and Austin Reed in 2022.

Touchdowns 
The single-season touchdowns record has been broken 10 times since 1937: by O'Brien in 1938 (19), Stan Heath in 1948 (22), Babe Parilli in 1950 (23), Rhome in 1964 (32), Dennis Shaw in 1969 (39), McMahon in 1980 (47), David Klingler in 1990 (54), Colt Brennan in 2006 (58), Joe Burrow in 2019 (60), and Zappe in 2021 (62). 

Only eight players have led the NCAA in passing touchdowns in multiple seasons.  They are Parilli in 1950 and 1951; Charley Johnson in 1959 and 1960; Gary Huff in 1971 and 1972; Bosco in 1984 and 1985; Danny Wuerffel in 1995 and 1996; Chad Pennington in 1997 and 1999; Brennan in 2005 and 2006; Case Keenum in 2009 and 2011; and Doughty in 2014 and 2015.

Passer rating 
The single-season record for passer rating was broken twice between 1937 and 1952: by Bill Mackrides in 1946 (176.9) and Ron Morris in 1952 (177.4). Morris' record would last for more than 40 years before being broken by Danny Wuerffel in 1995 (178.4), with Shaun King surpassing it three years later (183.3). The record next fell to Russell Wilson (191.8 in 2011). Since then, the record fell in every season from 2016 to 2021. Baker Mayfield broke the record twice, with 196.4 in 2016 and 198.9 in 2017, followed by Tua Tagovailoa (199.5 in 2018), Joe Burrow (202.0 in 2019), Mac Jones (203.1 in 2020), and Grayson McCall (207.6 in 2021).

In addition to Mayfield, the only players to have led in passer rating in multiple seasons are Jerry Tagge in 1970 and 1971, McMahon in 1980 and 1981, Elvis Grbac in 1991 and 1992, and Sam Bradford in 2007 and 2008.

Overall 
The only season in which records were set in all three of the listed categories was 2021, when Zappe set records for yardage and touchdowns, and McCall set the record for passer rating.

Leading programs

Programs with multiple passing leaders (in any of the three categories, including ties for the lead) include: 
 BYU – 9 (Steve Sarkisian, John Walsh, Ty Detmer, Robbie Bosco, Steve Young, Jim McMahon, Marc Wilson, Gifford Nielsen, Gary Sheide)
 San Diego State – 7 (Todd Santos, Craig Penrose, Craig Kimball, Jesse Freitas, Brian Sipe, Dennis Shaw, and Bob Reinhart)
 Stanford – 7 (John Elway, Turk Schonert, Steve Dils, Jim Plunkett, Dick Norman, John Brodie, and Bobby Garrett) 
 Florida – 5 (Kyle Trask, Tim Tebow, Rex Grossman, Danny Wuerffel, and Kerwin Bell)
 Houston – 5 (Case Keenum, Jimmy Klingler, David Klingler, Andre Ware, and Bo Burris)
 Texas Tech – 5 (Graham Harrell, Sonny Cumbie, B. J. Symons, Kliff Kingsbury, and Patrick Mahomes)
 Alabama – 4 (Mac Jones, A. J. McCarron, Steve Sloan, Tua Tagovailoa)
 Baylor – 4 (Seth Russell, Nick Florence, Don Trull, and Billy Patterson) 
 Fresno State – 4 (Derek Carr, David Carr, Trent Dilfer, and Jeff Tedford)
 Nevada – 4 (Mike Maxwell, Chris Vargas, Stan Heath, and Bill Mackrides) 
 Arizona – 3 (Eddie Wilson, Fred Enke, Mark Reed)
 Arizona State – 3 (John Jacobs, John Hangartner, Rudy Carpenter)
 Boise State – 3 (Kellen Moore, Ryan Dinwiddie, and Bart Hendricks)
 Florida State – 3 (Jameis Winston, Chris Weinke, and Gary Huff)  
 Miami – 3 (Steve Walsh, Vinny Testaverde, and George Mira)
 Michigan – 3 (Jim Harbaugh, Elvis Grbac, and Benny Friedman)
 Notre Dame – 3 (Gus Dorais, George Gipp, and John Mohardt)
 Oklahoma – 3 (Claude Arnold, Sam Bradford, and Baker Mayfield)
 Tulsa – 3 (Billy Anderson, Ron Morris, and Jerry Rhome)
 Western Kentucky – 3 (Brandon Doughty, Austin Reed, and Bailey Zappe)
 Purdue - 2 (Len Dawson, Ron DiGravio)
 Boston College – 2 (Jack Concannon, Doug Flutie)
 Hawaii – 2 (Colt Brennan, Bryant Moniz)
 Missouri – 2 (Paul Christman, Drew Lock)
 Ohio State – 2 (Dwayne Haskins, C. J. Stroud)
 Oregon State – 2 (Terry Baker, Gordon Queen)
 Virginia Tech – 2 (Don Strock, Michael Vick)
 Yale – 2 (Brian Dowling, Dick Winterbauer)

Passing leaders 
Key
† = Winner of that year's Heisman Trophy
* = Winner of that year's Sammy Baugh Trophy as the nation's top college passer
# = Winner of that year's Davey O'Brien Award as the best NCAA quarterback
Bold = Figure established an NCAA major college record

Pre-1937 unofficial data 
Before 1937 the NCAA did not compile official statistics. This chart reflects unofficial passing statistics compiled by historians mostly from newspapers accounts.

References

Passing